Zacarias Andias (born 30 September 1931) is a Portuguese rower. He competed in the men's eight event at the 1952 Summer Olympics.

References

External links
 

1931 births
Living people
Portuguese male rowers
Olympic rowers of Portugal
Rowers at the 1952 Summer Olympics
Place of birth missing (living people)